Eser Yenenler (born 14 February 1984) is a Turkish comedian, TV presenter and actor.

Personal life
A part of his family is originally from North Africa. He graduated from Marmara University with a degree in Business Administration and master of marketing and advertising . His father died when he was 6 years old. He has two older sisters. His ex girlfriend is Farah Zeynep Abdullah. In 2019, he married Berfu Yıldız, with whom he has two sons.

Career
Yenenler started acting on stage at the age of 11. He started his career on stage by joining Bursa Municipal Youth Theatre, Bursa State Theatre, and Istanbul Academy of Life respectively. 

He made his television debut in 2003 with the hit series Aliye, in which he played the role of Özgür. Since 2006, he became part of BKM Mutfak directed by Yılmaz Erdoğan. While in the organization, he works as a presenter, screenwriter and actor on the comedy program Çok Güzel Hareketler Bunlar.

For a while he presented Star TV's Eyvah Düşüyorum contest. With  İbrahim Büyükak and Oğuzhan Koç, he performed stand up in Europe and Turkey.Additionally, they started the 3+1 talk show on Star TV. Under Acun Media's production, they later continued the program under the name 3 Adam. Yenenler also served as a judge on Yetenek Sizsiniz Türkiye (Turkish version of Got Talent) alongside Ali Taran and Seda Bakan from 2013 to 2017.

He performed his solo musical stand up, titled "TBT" in BKM. In 2017, he appeared on the tribute album Mirkelam Şarkıları, in which he performed the song "Ah Bir Joker". In 2018, he started his own talk show on TV8 called "Eser Yenenler Show" and panel "EYS Gece Modu". He founded writer company "Cetto".

In 2022, He performs stand up "Çift Terapisi" with Berfu Yıldız. He played in film "Prestij Meselesi" about Prestij music company.

Filmography

References

External links 
 
 

Living people
1984 births
Turkish male stage actors
Turkish male television actors
Turkish television presenters
Turkish male film actors
Marmara University alumni